Ollie Imogene "Jean" Shepard (November 21, 1933 – September 25, 2016) was an American honky-tonk singer-songwriter who is often acknowledged as a pioneer for women in country music. Shepard released a total of 73 singles to the Hot Country Songs chart, one of which reached the number-one spot. She recorded a total of 24 studio albums between 1956 and 1981, and became a member of the Grand Ole Opry in 1955.

After Kitty Wells' 1952 breakthrough, Shepard quickly followed, and a national television gig and the Opry helped make her a star when few female country singers had enduring success. Her first hit, "A Dear John Letter", a 1953 duet with Ferlin Husky, was the first post-World War II record by a woman country artist to sell more than a million copies.

Biography
Ollie Imogene Shepard was born November 21, 1933, in Pauls Valley, Oklahoma, one of 10 children. She was raised in Visalia, California, near Bakersfield.

As a teenager, she played bass in the Melody Ranch Girls, an all-female band formed in 1948. Hank Thompson discovered Shepard a few years later. With Thompson's help, Shepard signed with Capitol Records in 1952, following the success of Kitty Wells' "It Wasn't God Who Made Honky Tonk Angels" Shepard cut four songs at her first session with popular band players Jimmy Bryant, Speedy West, Cliffie Stone, and Billy Strange. She recorded her first single for the label in 1952, "Crying Steel Guitar Waltz", but it failed to chart.

1953–56: Breakthrough

Shepard's first chart appearance was 1953's duet with Ferlin Husky, with "A Dear John Letter". It was a number-one smash, and also became a major crossover pop hit, peaking at number four on the Billboard pop chart. The song struck a chord with audiences as it was a half-spoken duet about a soldier in the Korean War. The duo's follow-up, "Forgive Me John", was another crossover hit, peaking in the top 10 on the country chart and the top 25 on the pop chart. Because at 20 she was still a minor, Shepard's parents signed her rights to Husky so she could tour.

In 1955, Shepard joined ABC-TV's nationally telecast Ozark Jubilee for several years, and recorded her first studio album, Songs of a Love Affair, written by Shepard. She also charted her first solo top-10 single, "A Satisfied Mind", that same year, backed by the number-13 hit, "Take Possession". "A Satisfied Mind" peaked at number four on the Billboard country chart. Shepard had another top-five hit the same year with "Beautiful Lies". Its flip side, "I Thought of You", peaked in the country top 10. Her streak of hit singles led to an invitation to join the Grand Ole Opry in 1955 as one of its few female stars; Kitty Wells and Minnie Pearl were the only others.

Because she was a honky-tonk singer when the Nashville sound was popular, Shepard had just two charting country singles between 1956 and 1963. Those two singles, 1958's "I Want to Go Where No One Knows Me" and 1959's "Have Heart Will Love", earned her the title of Cash Box'''s Top Female Artist of 1959.

In 1960, Shepard married fellow Opry star Hawkshaw Hawkins, whom she had met on Ozark Jubilee. He died three years later in the same plane crash that killed Patsy Cline and Cowboy Copas. Shepard gave birth to their son Hawkshaw Jr. just one month after the crash. She later married country music musician and singer Benny Birchfield; the two remained married until her death. He was injured in a stabbing along with their granddaughter, who died, December 18, 2016, in his home in Tennessee.

1964–78: Commercial resurgence

Shepard returned to the top 10 in 1964 with "Second Fiddle (To an Old Guitar)", which began a string of hits and proved a commercial comeback. In 1964 and 1965, she had two top-40 hits with "A Tear Dropped By" and "Someone's Gotta Cry", from the Heart, We Did All That We Could LP released in 1967. In 1966, Shepard recorded a duet with country singer Ray Pillow titled "I'll Take the Dog", which peaked at number 9 on the Billboard country chart. This was followed by two solo hit singles the same year: the top-10 hit "If the Teardrops Were Silver" and the top-15 hit "Many Happy Hangovers to You".

In 1967, Shepard had two top-20 hits with the title track of Heart, We Did All That We Could and the single "Your Forevers Don't Last Very Long". The following year, she had only one top-40 hit, but continued to release albums, which included 1968's A Real Good Woman. In 1969, Shepard's LP, Seven Lonely Days, produced the hit single of the same name that reached the top 20. With the release of 1969's "Then He Touched Me", Shepard had a top-10 hit, followed by three hits in 1970, including the top-15 hit "Another Lonely Night". Shepard had one more top-40 hit with 1971's "With His Hand in Mine".

In the early 1970s, Shepard moved to United Artists Records. Her first single for the label in 1973, the Bill Anderson-penned "Slippin' Away", was her biggest solo hit since the 1950s. The single peaked at number four on the Billboard country chart and charted on the Billboard pop chart, peaking outside the top 40. Shepard's hits continued throughout the 1970s, though as the decade wore on, she hit the top 40 less frequently. She had three top-20 hits in 1974, beginning with the number-13 smash "At the Time" and "I'll Do Anything it Takes (to Stay with You)". In 1975, Shepard recorded an album of songs written by Bill Anderson titled Poor Sweet Baby (and Ten More Bill Anderson Songs). Both singles from the album were top-20 hits on the Billboard country chart between 1974 and 1975, and were her last top-40 singles.

Shepard was known in country music as a "staunch traditionalist" and created some controversy when she served as president of the Association of Country Entertainers, formed in response to Olivia Newton-John's CMA Female Vocalist of the Year win in 1974. The organization was intended to keep country music "pure" and criticized the pop influences at the time.

In 1975 and 1976, Shepard recorded two albums, I'm a Believer and Mercy/Ain't Love Good, and then left the label in 1976. In response, United Artists released a Greatest Hits compilation. Between 1977 and 1978, she recorded for the smaller GRT label, which produced minor hit singles on the Billboard country chart. She had her last charting record in 1978 under the label with "The Real Thing".

1980–2016: Later years
After leaving GRT at the end of the 1970s, Shepard did not record again until 1981, when she released a final studio album under the label Laserlight titled, Dear John, which included remakes of her hits, including "A Dear John Letter" and "Slippin' Away", and also included a new song, "Too Many Rivers". She continued to perform at the Grand Ole Opry and to tour, both in the US and in the UK, where she had a strong fan base, until 2015. Her work was reissued by Bear Family Records.

In 2005, Shepard celebrated 50 years as a member of the Opry and, at the time of her death, she was the longest-running living member of the Opry. In 2011, Shepard was inducted into the Country Music Hall of Fame along with songwriter Bobby Braddock and fellow Oklahoma singer Reba McEntire. In 2014, Shepard's autobiography, Down Through the Years, was published. On November 21, 2015, Shepard became the first woman to be a member of the Grand Ole Opry for 60 consecutive years—a feat that only one other person has achieved. She retired from the stage that night.

On September 25, 2016, Shepard died of Parkinson's disease at the age of 82.

Shepard was posthumously featured in Ken Burns' Country Music in 2019.

Discography

 Songs of a Love Affair (1956)
 Lonesome Love (1958)
 Got You on My Mind (1961)
 Heartaches and Tears'' (1962)

References

External links

Jean Shepard biography at Opry.com
Jean Shepard biography at CMT.com

1933 births
2016 deaths
American women country singers
American country singer-songwriters
People from Pauls Valley, Oklahoma
Singer-songwriters from Oklahoma
Grand Ole Opry members
Capitol Records artists
United Artists Records artists
Bakersfield sound
Country Music Hall of Fame inductees
Members of the Country Music Association
Deaths from Parkinson's disease
Neurological disease deaths in Tennessee
American autobiographers
20th-century American singers
21st-century American singers
20th-century American women singers
21st-century American women singers
Country musicians from Oklahoma
Women autobiographers